The Mühlauer Bach is a river of Tyrol, Austria. It is a left-side tributary of the Inn.

It flows in southern direction through , a district of Innsbruck, where it discharges into the Inn. Next to the Inn, the Mühlauer Bach is the richest flowing waters of the city. It has a length of just under . With the exception of the source, it lies in full in the Innsbruck city area.

Usage
The upper course until the  has Grade A quality. There is also the main water reservoir of the entire city. The Mühlauer Bach is also important for industrial purposes because a power plant in Mühlau provides the nearby commercial district with electricity. In the lower course the quality remains constantly at B even though the service water. Small fish population can be found in the broad sections.

Myth
The end of the gorge , where the Mühlauer Bach flows, is called "Devil’s pulpit“. It is said that a Tatzelwurm was defeated here and its blood turned into water.

References

Rivers of Tyrol (state)
Rivers of Austria